Pontian Kechil (Jawi: ڤونتين كچيل) also known as Pontian Town (Malay: Bandar Pontian) is a town and the administrative centre of Pontian District, Johor, Malaysia.

History
The town was originally a fishing village. Now it has grown as a town.

Geography

The town spans over an area of 6.6 km2.

Administration
Pontian is administered by Pontian Municipal Council (MPPn). Pontian's postcode is 82000.

Transportation

Buses
The town is served by MyBas Johor(T50)& Maju (96) public buses linking to Larkin Sentral Terminal in Johor Bahru City and other towns within the district, such as Benut and Kukup.

Car
Being located along Federal Route 5, Pontian is relatively accessible for a town its size. Northward this highway goes to Melaka City, Klang and Teluk Intan before terminating at Jelapang. Southwards highway 5 turn right to Pekan Nanas and terminates at Johor Bahru.

Shopping
Pontian Plaza

References

Towns in Johor
Pontian District